News-Times may refer to the following newspapers:

The News-Times, a newspaper in the U.S. city of Danbury, Connecticut
The Columbia County News–Times, a newspaper in Columbia County, Georgia
News Times, a newspaper in Hartford City, Indiana
News-Times (Forest Grove), a newspaper in the U.S. state of Oregon
News-Times (Newport), a newspaper in the U.S. state of Oregon
News Time, Indian television news channel in West Bengal
News Time Assam or Pratidin Time, Indian television news channel in Assam